The Matsu New Village, also called New Matsu Village, Mazu New Village, is a restored military dependents' settlement in Zhongli District, Taoyuan City, Taiwan.

The Matsu New Village has been lauded as the "Taoyuan General Village". The name of the village was not derived because the local residents came from Matsu but it was during a trip when Chiang Kai-shek’s wife, Soong Mei-Ling led the Armed Forces Entertainment Regiment to visit Matsu and enhance troop morale.

Matsu New Village was the only village in Taoyuan to have been selected by the Ministry of National Defense in 2012 as one of the 13 national “Cultural Preservation Areas for Military Dependents’ Villages.”

References

Buildings and structures in Taoyuan City
Military dependents' village, Taiwan
New towns started in the 1950s